Bilateral relations between China and Italy date back to Imperial China and Ancient Rome but the ties between Italy and modern China only formally began on 27 November 1928 (began in 1913) and recognized the People's Republic on 6 November 1970. News of Italy's recognition of the People's Republic of China and consequent breaking of formal relations with the Republic of China (Taiwan) spurred other European countries such as Austria and Belgium to consider similar moves.

Italian Foreign Minister Pietro Nenni presented the proposal for the recognition of China in January 1969. The Italian Communist Party had invited Chinese representatives to attend their 1969 party congress; however, the Chinese side declined the invitation. The two countries exchanged ambassadors in February of the following year.

Currently, China and Italy participate in high-level political exchanges. In September 2005, Chinese Defense Minister Cao Gangchuan and Italian Deputy Defense Minister Salvatore Cicu expressed their hope for closer military cooperation between the two countries.

Hongdu Aviation, one of China's major aircraft manufacturers, was first established as Sino-Italian National Aircraft Works (SINAW) in 1934, as a joint venture between the Republic of China and the Kingdom of Italy. However, after the Second Sino-Japanese War broke out in 1937, Italy became an ally of Japan and assisted Japan in its bombing of SINAW factories. The Chinese government confiscated Italian properties in December 1937 and all Italian employees of the company left by the end of the year. On March 24, 2019, Italy signed up to the Belt and Road Initiative, becoming the first G7 nation to do so.

Chinese people in Italy, comprising both recent immigrants as well as persons of Chinese descent born in Italy, form a significant minority especially in Lombardy, Tuscany, and Lazio.

History
The Roman historian Florus describes the visit of numerous envoys, including Seres (Chinese or central Asians), to the first Roman Emperor Augustus, who reigned between 27 BC and 14. However, Henry Yule speculated that these were more likely to have been private merchants than diplomats, since Chinese records insist that Gan Ying was the first Chinese to reach as far west as Tiaozhi (條支; Mesopotamia) in 97 AD. In 97 the Chinese general Ban Chao dispatched an envoy to Rome in the person of Gan Ying. Gan Ying never made it to Rome. He might have reached the eastern coast of the Mediterranean, although he most likely went no further than the Persian Gulf. Monk turned diplomat Rabban Bar Sauma traveled from Beijing to Rome in the 1280s. Andalò da Savignone, an Italian resident in the small Genoese colony in Zaytun, was sent by the Khans from Beijing to Italy as a diplomat to the pope in 1336. Chinese diplomats have been active in Italy since the time of the Qing dynasty and just a few decades after the Unification of Italy. The Qing dynasty diplomat Li Fengbao was ambassador to Italy in the late 19th century, as were his contemporaries Kung Chao-Yuan, Xue Fucheng and Xu Jingcheng. The Republic of China would later send its own ambassadors after Italy's recognition of the Republic.

In Roman Times, the first group of people claiming to be an ambassadorial mission of Romans to China was recorded in 166 AD in the Book of the Later Han. The embassy came to Emperor Huan of Han China from "Andun" (Emperor Antoninus Pius or Marcus Aurelius Antoninus), "king of Daqin" (Rome). In 226 AD China was visited by the Roman Qin Lun, who wasn't a diplomat but a merchant. He visited the court of Sun Quan in Nanjing. Other Roman envoys followed in the 3rd century. One embassy from Daqin (Rome) is recorded as bringing tributary gifts to the Chinese Jin Empire (266–420 AD).

The most notable contact between China and Italy dates back to over 700 years ago, with Italian explorer Marco Polo famously sojourning in the country for seventeen years between 1271 and 1295, a few decades after Giovanni da Pian del Carpine's visit to Karakorum. Polo's visit was followed by the arrival in Beijing of Giovanni da Montecorvino, the first archbishop of Beijing, in 1294. Michele Ruggieri, an Italian Jesuit priest from Apulia and one of the founding figures of the Jesuit China missions, was the first European to enter the Forbidden City.

The Kingdom of Italy established diplomatic relations with China in 1866. Italy received its concession in Tientsin on 7 September 1901. The concession was occupied by the Japanese in 1937, and liberated in October 1945 by the Chinese Army. Italy officially renounced to the concession in 1947. On October 16, 1866 a trade treaty between China an Italy was signed, and eight months later the ambassador Count Vittorio Sallier de la Tour, appointed Italian representative to the courts of Jeddo and Beijing, arrived in East Asia. He and his successors Alessandro Fè d’Ostiani and Raffaele Ulisse Barbolani, however, kept their seat in Japan. Ferdinando de Luca was the first Italian ambassador to be headquartered in China, establishing the embassy in Shanghai, which was moved to Beijing at the end of the 1880s. In 1913, Italy recognized Sun Yat-sen's Republic, and thereafter maintained a position of neutrality in the various conflicts with different parties vying for power in China. Italy formally recognized Kuomintang's Republic of China, and on November 27, 1928 signed a new trade treaty, which supplanted the 1866 treaty. The negotiations were led by Daniele Varè and the treaty signed in Nanjing, China's new capital. Chang Kai-shek insisted that all the Occidental powers move their embassies in Nanjing, considering this action as the further, final acknowledgment of his power. Italy, as some other great powers, decided to split its embassy between Nanjing and Shanghai, in two physically detached offices.

At the end of 1937 Fascist Italy recognized Manchukuo, and in 1941 it recognized Wang Jingwei's Republic of China, with its capital in Nanjing, although the Italian ambassadors continued to reside in Shanghai for some more time. The Italian delegate Pier Pasquale Spinelli then decided to move the embassy's principal seat to Nanjing, while also reopening the detached offices of Beijing and Shanghai. In 1945, Mussolini's followers kept in touch with Wang Jingwei's government in Beijing, Shanghai and Nanjing, while the post-fascist Ministry of Foreign Affairs worked to resume contact with Chiang Kai-shek, to whom the new Italian representative Sergio Fenoaltea officially presented his credentials in October 1946 in Naijing. In 1945, the Italians were about to loan the offices of the closed embassy in Beijing to the Americans, which however didn't materialize because before the Americans arrived, a group of Chinese, on the nationalist side but following the orders of an independent general looking for riches, looted the embassy and damaged the building and the archives. After the start of the offensive in 1947, the Chinese communists took Beijing in 1949 and shortly after Naijing. In November 1950, Fenoaltea, who had been pressuring Rome to let him come back to Italy, departed from China. Diplomatic relations were then led by Ezio Mizzan who, in February 1951, reported that the communist police was restricting ever more his activities and movements and that the permanence of the Italian embassy in Naijing, Chang Kai-shek's and Wang Jingwei's former capital, may cause political inconveniences. He advised Rome to take a firm decision either recognizing China, moving him and the embassy to Beijing, or moving all diplomats out. After initially leaning towards following such countries as Denmark, Norway and the United Kingdom in recognizing China, Italy chose the opposite, dismantling Naijing's embassy and breaking diplomatic relations, influenced by  the counsel of the United States, which had initially pondered allowing Italy's recognition of China to pave the way for the inevitable recognition by them.

Italy and China wouldn't recognize each other until 1970. During the twenty-year break of diplomatic relations, Italy didn't have an embassy in China, and maintained relations with nationalist China, although it never sent an ambassador to Taipei either. In the twenty-year break, Italy "limited itself to giving some unspecified duties of observation of the Chinese question" to its general consulate in Hong Kong. In 1970, the news of Italy's recognition of the People's Republic of China and consequent breaking of formal relations with the Republic of China spurred other European countries such as Austria and Belgium to consider similar moves.

In March 2020, Chinese state owned TV channel CGTN and Chinese newspaper Global Times were reported to have attempted to spread a disinformation campaign that the COVID-19 pandemic may have originated in Italy after the United States.

On 13 March 2020, China sent medical supplies, including masks and respirators to Italy, together with a team of Chinese medical staff to help Italy and fight the virus across the country. After China donated millions of masks, China sold masks to Italy. These were not donations but rather paid products and services. On March 24, 2020, Italian Foreign Minister Luigi Di Maio stated in an interview that after the outbreak in Italy, China was the first to provide Italy with medical supplies and dispatch medical experts. When the virus broke out, Italy was accused of dumping materials used to protect Italians at a low price because it presented 40,000 masks to China. Today, China is giving back millions of masks. Italian Prime Minister Giuseppe Conte thanked China for its support and assistance. However, in April 2020 after the tragedy, it was reported that the PPE kits sold by China to Italy were the same that Italy had earlier donated to China during the initial spread of the COVID-19 in China.
 The Chinese Ministry of Foreign Affairs responded: This is false news. The Italian government did not respond yet.

In May 2020, Chinese official spokespeople tweeted videos of Italians chanting "Grazie, Cina" with China's national anthem playing in the background. Analysis of the video revealed the video to be doctored and raised concerns about Chinese propaganda activities in the European Union including urging European officials to heap praise on China and attempts to undermine Europe's response to the health crisis and project China and Russia as the only ones with a robust strategy to combat COVID-19.

Security concerns
In March 2019, Italy's parliamentary Comitato parlamentare per la sicurezza della Repubblica (COPASIR), the body of the Italian Parliament to oversee the Italian intelligence agencies raised concerns that Italy joining the Belt and Road Initiative (BRI) project could present security risks for Italy given that infrastructure, telecoms, finance were all in the BRI agreement package to be signed with China. The chief of COPASIR also raised the concerns of  "evaluation of possible risks" in the area of cyber security.

Concerns have been raised by the EU and the US over technology transfer and protection of intellectual property of European partners as well as Chinese involvement in Italian telecommunications networks raising fears regarding network security in Europe and the US.

In October 2020, in signs of Italy toughening its stance with respect to communications and network security, the Italian government vetoed a 5G deal between Italian telecom firm Fastweb and China's Huawei. Earlier in July, Italy's largest telecom company Telecom Italia (TIM) had left Huawei out of an invitation to tender for a contract to supply 5G equipment for its core network, where sensitive data was processed.

Resident diplomatic missions 
 China has an embassy in Rome and consulates-general in Florence and Milan.
 Italy has an embassy in Beijing and consulates-general in Chongqing, Guangzhou, Hong Kong and Shanghai.

Cuisine 
In 2021, CNN rated Italy and China as the top two countries with the best food, respectively.

See also 
 Foreign relations of Italy
 Prospero Intorcetta
 Ludovico Buglio
 Nicolò Longobardo
 Europeans in Medieval China, primarily the 13th–14th centuries
 Giovanni de' Marignolli, 14th century Archbishop of Khanbaliq (Beijing)
 Giuseppe Castiglione (Jesuit painter), a court painter for the Qianlong Emperor during the 18th century
 John of Montecorvino, 13th–14th century Archbishop of Khanbaliq (Beijing)
 Katarina Vilioni, 14th-century Italian woman who lived in Yangzhou
 Marco Polo, 13th-century merchant who served as an envoy for the Yuan dynasty
 Matteo Ricci, Jesuit missionary who arrived in Ming-dynasty China in 1582, created a world map in Chinese and translated texts
 Odoric of Pordenone, Christian missionary to Yuan-dynasty China
 Rabban Bar Sauma, 13th century native of Zhongdu (Beijing) who travelled to Europe and met the pope and various European monarchs
 Sino-Roman relations, Han dynasty and Roman Empire relations beginning at least by 166 AD with Antoninus Pius and Marcus Aurelius (see also Daqin)

References

Sources
 Yule, Henry (1915). Henri Cordier (ed.), Cathay and the Way Thither: Being a Collection of Medieval Notices of China, Vol I: Preliminary Essay on the Intercourse Between China and the Western Nations Previous to the Discovery of the Cape Route. London: Hakluyt Society. Retrieved 21 September 2016.
 Ball, Warwick (2016). Rome in the East: Transformation of an Empire, 2nd edition. London: Routledge, .
 Young, Gary K. (2001). Rome's Eastern Trade: International Commerce and Imperial Policy, 31 BC – AD 305. London: Routledge, .

Further reading
 Fardella, Enrico. "A significant periphery of the Cold War: Italy-China bilateral relations, 1949–1989." Cold War History 17.2 (2017): 181–197.
 Maurizio Marinelli, Giovanni Andornino, Italy's Encounter with Modern China
 Maurizio Marinelli, “The Triumph of the Uncanny: Italians and Italian Architecture in Tianjin”, In Cultural Studies Review, Vol. 19, 2, 2013, 70–98.
 Maurizio Marinelli, “The Genesis of the Italian Concession in Tianjin: A Combination of Wishful Thinking and Realpolitik”. Journal of Modern Italian Studies, 15 (4), 2010: 536–556.

 
Italy
Bilateral relations of Italy